Valeria is a genus of moths of the family Noctuidae.

Species
Valeria exanthema Boursin, 1955
Valeria jaspidea Denis & Schiffermüller, 1775
Valeria karthalea Kuhna & Schmitz, 1997
Valeria mienshani Draudt, 1950
Valeria oleagina (Denis & Schiffermüller, 1775)
Valeria tricristata de Villers, 1789

References
Natural History Museum Lepidoptera genus database
Valeria at funet

Cuculliinae